Budge Patty defeated Jaroslav Drobný 6–1, 6–2, 3–6, 5–7, 7–5 in the final to win the men's singles tennis title at the 1950 French Championships.

Seeds
The seeded players are listed below. Budge Patty is the champion; others show the round in which they were eliminated.

 Jaroslav Drobný (finalist)
 Frank Sedgman (fourth round)
 William Talbert (semifinals)
 Eric Sturgess (semifinals)
 Arthur D. Larsen (quarterfinals)
 John Bromwich (quarterfinals)
 Budge Patty (champion)
 Victor Elias Seixas (quarterfinals)

Draw

Key
 Q = Qualifier
 WC = Wild card
 LL = Lucky loser
 r = Retired

Finals

Earlier rounds

Section 1

Section 2

Section 3

Section 4

Section 5

Section 6

Section 7

Section 8

References

External links
 

1950
1950 in French tennis